Pancratieae are a small European tribe of subfamily Amaryllidoideae (family Amaryllidaceae), consisting of two genera including the type genus, Pancratium.

Taxonomy

Phylogeny 
The placement of Pancratieae within subfamily Amaryllidoideae is shown in the 
following cladogram:

Subdivision 
Two genera:
Pancratium
Vagaria

References

Bibliography

 Meerow A. 1995. Towards a phylogeny of the Amaryllidaceae. In P. J. Rudall, P. J. Cribb, D. F. Cutler, and C. J. Humphries [eds.], Monocotyledons: systematics and evolution, 169–179. Royal Botanic Gardens, Kew.
 
 Meerow A. and D. A. Snijman. 1998 Amaryllidaceae. In K. Kubitzki [ed.], Families and genera of vascular plants, vol. 3, 83–110. Springer-Verlag, Berlin.
 Meerow, Alan W. Michael F. Fay, Charles L Guy, Qin-BaoLi, Faridah Q Zaman and Mark W. Chase. 1999 Systematics of Amaryllidaceae based on cladistic analysis of plastid sequence data. American Journal of Botany. 86: 1325.
  Full text

External links 

Amaryllidoideae
Monocot tribes